Milady Tack-Fang (born 28 July 1949) is a Cuban foil fencer. She competed at the 1968 and 1976 Summer Olympics.

References

1949 births
Living people
Cuban female foil fencers
Olympic fencers of Cuba
Fencers at the 1968 Summer Olympics
Fencers at the 1976 Summer Olympics
Pan American Games medalists in fencing
Pan American Games gold medalists for Cuba
Pan American Games silver medalists for Cuba
Fencers at the 1967 Pan American Games
Fencers at the 1975 Pan American Games
20th-century Cuban women
21st-century Cuban women